The 2008 AIHL season was the ninth season of the Australian Ice Hockey League (AIHL). It ran from 19 April 2008 until 24 August 2008, with the Goodall Cup finals following on 30 and 31 August 2008. The Bears won the H Newman Reid Trophy (backdated) after finishing the regular season first in the league standings. The Newcastle North Stars won the Goodall Cup for the fourth time by defeating the Western Sydney Ice Dogs in the final.

League business 

In 2008, Brisbane Blue Tongues became the Gold Coast Blue Tongues after the team relocated from Brisbane's Ice World in Boondall to Gold Coast's Iceland Bundall ice rink.

April 2008, the Hunter Ice Skating Stadium was significantly upgraded for the 2008 IIHF World Championship Division II, featuring plexi-glass boards, along with new lighting, scoreboards and expanded seating. The upgrade saw the Newcastle venue selected by the AIHL for the 2008 Goodall Cup finals weekend.

On 17 June, financial difficulties forced the Adelaide Avalanche to withdraw from the remainder of the 2008 season, leading to the cancellation and forfeiting of its 21 and 22 June games in Canberra and Penrith against the Knights (double points match) and Bears. Following negotiations, the Thebarton Ice Arena was one week later given a license for a new Adelaide team, the Adelaide A's, to fulfil the Avalanche's remaining commitments for the season, and inheriting their 2008 season results.

Regular season 
The regular season began on 19 April 2008 and will run through to 24 August 2008 before the top four teams advanced to compete in the Goodall Cup playoff series.

April 

Notes:

May

June 

Notes:

July

August

Standings 

Source

Statistics

Scoring leaders 
List shows the ten top skaters sorted by points, then goals. Current as of 31 August 2008

Leading goaltenders 
Only the top five goaltenders, based on save percentage with a minimum 40% of the team's ice time. Current as of 31 August 2008

Goodall Cup playoffs 

The 2008 playoffs was scheduled for 30 August with the Goodall Cup final held on 31 August 2008. Following the end of the regular season the top four teams advanced to the playoff series which was held at the redeveloped Hunter Ice Skating Stadium in Warners Bay, Newcastle, New South Wales. The series was a single game elimination with the two winning semi-finalists advancing to the Goodall Cup final. The Goodall Cup was won by the Newcastle North Stars (4th title) who defeated the Western Sydney Ice Dogs 4-1. The North Star's Canadian import forward, Mickey Gilchrist, was named the finals most valuable player (MVP).

All times are UTC+10:00

Semi-finals

Final

References

External links 
 Official website of the AIHL
 2008 AIHL Rosters

AIHL season
AIHL
Australian Ice Hockey League seasons